The Hangzhou–Jiaxing–Huzhou Plain, or Hangjiahu Plain is the largest plain in Zhejiang province, and is an integral part of the Yangtze Delta. It includes all of the prefecture-level city of Jiaxing, most of Huzhou, and the northeastern part of Hangzhou.

Geography
The plain has a humid subtropical climate (Köppen Cfa), influenced by the East Asian Monsoon, with cool winters and very hot and humid summers. The topography is generally low-lying and flat, at around  elevation, though slightly higher to the south and east and lower sloping towards Lake Tai. Its river and canal network, including the Grand Canal itself, at 12.7 km per km2 (20.4 mi per sq. mi.), is the densest in all of China. From the 1960s to the 2000s, declining aquifer levels from continual groundwater extraction have caused some of the strongest land subsidence in China.

References

External links

Geography of Zhejiang
Hangzhou
Jiaxing
Huzhou
Plains of China